Senator Deal may refer to:

Edson H. Deal (1903–1967), Idaho State Senate
Joseph T. Deal (1860–1942), Virginia State Senate
Nathan Deal (born 1942), Georgia State Senate